Saili Rane (born 25 June 1993) is an Indian badminton player who currently plays Singles.

Achievements

BWF International Challenge/Series

 BWF International Challenge tournament
 BWF International Series tournament

References

External links
 

Indian female badminton players
Living people
1993 births
21st-century Indian women
21st-century Indian people